NGC 6863 is an asterism in the constellation Aquila. The celestial object was found on July 25, 1827 by the British astronomer John Herschel.

In 2009 an astronomical study by Bidin et al concluded that whereas the small group of stars in Aquila had been classified as an OCR (Open Cluster Remnant ie the dispersed remains of a group of physically related stars) they were in fact an asterism, a group of unrelated stellar bodies.

See also 
List of NGC-objects

External links 
 SIMBAD Astronomical Database
 SEDS

References 

Asterisms (astronomy)